In computer science, a container is a class or a data structure<ref>Paul E. Black (ed.), entry for data structure in Dictionary of Algorithms and Data Structures. US National Institute of Standards and Technology.15 December 2004. Accessed 4 Oct 2011.</ref> whose instances are collections of other objects. In other words, they store objects in an organized way that follows specific access rules.

The size of the container depends on the number of objects (elements) it contains. Underlying (inherited) implementations of various container types may vary in size, complexity and type of language, but in many cases they  provide flexibility in choosing the right implementation for any given scenario. 

Container data structures are commonly used in many types of programming languages.

Function and properties
Containers can be characterized by the following three properties:
 access, that is the way of accessing the objects of the container. In the case of arrays, access is done with the array index. In the case of stacks, access is done according to the LIFO (last in, first out) order and in the case of queues it is done according to the FIFO (first in, first out) order;
 storage, that is the way of storing the objects of the container;
 traversal, that is the way of traversing the objects of the container.

Container classes are expected to implement CRUD-like methods to do the following:
 create an empty container (constructor);
 insert objects into the container;
 delete objects from the container;
 delete all the objects in the container (clear);
 access the objects in the container;
 access the number of objects in the container (count).

Containers are sometimes implemented in conjunction with iterators.

Types
Containers may be classified as either single-value containers or associative containers''.

Single-value containers store each object independently. Objects may be accessed directly, by a language loop construct (e.g. for loop) or with an iterator.

An associative container uses an associative array, map, or dictionary, composed of key-value pairs, such that each key appears at most once in the container. The key is used to find the value, the object, if it is stored in the container. Associative containers are used in programming languages as class templates.

Container abstract data types include:

 FIFO queues
 LIFO stacks
 Priority queues
 Lookup tables (LUTs)
 Key-associated data structures
 Sets, containing and indexing objects by value or by specific property;
 Maps, associating to each key a "value" for lookup

Common data structures used to implement these abstract types include:
 Arrays and their derivatives
 Linked lists
 Binary search trees (BSTs), particularly self-balancing BSTs
 Hash tables

Graphic containers
Widget toolkits also use containers, which are special widgets to group other widgets, such as windows, panels. Apart from their graphical properties, they have the same type of behavior as container classes, as they keep a list of their child widgets, and allow adding, removing, or retrieving widgets among their children.

In statically-typed languages 

Container abstractions can be written in virtually any programming language, regardless of its type system. However, in strongly-typed object-oriented programming languages it may be somewhat complicated for a developer to write reusable homogeneous containers.

Because of differences in element types this results in a tedious process of writing and keeping a collection of containers for every elemental type.

Many elemental types (e.g. integers or floating numbers) are inherently incompatible with each other because of the memory size they occupy and their semantic meaning and therefore require different containers (unless of course, they are mutually compatible or convertible). Modern programming languages offer various approaches to help solving the problem:

 Universal basic type
 A type that is universally assignable by any other (e.g. root Object class).
Downcasting;
Class substitution
 Previous three approaches above are used for weakly typed languages; these usually imply inheritance and polymorphism shared by types.
Union types (C/C++ language)
 Permits storing types of different data sizes; it is hard to ensure which type is stored in a union upon retrieval however and should be carefully followed.
Type conversion
 Templates or Generics
 Ensures reusability and type safety; may be thought as a reverse inheritance. However, this approach may require implementing a template specialization which is reputedly a time-consuming process given that types differ in their methods.

See also 
List of data structures
Standard Template Library#Containers
Collection (abstract data type)
Stack data structure
Java ConcurrentMap

References

External links
Container Data Structure Declaration and Initialization

Abstract data types
Object-oriented programming

eo:Ujo
pt:Container (programação)
qu:Wisina